V. Jayaprakash is an Indian actor and producer who works in Tamil and Telugu-language films. He ventured into film business in the early 2000s as a producer, making several films under his banner GJ Cinema and later turned actor, with Cheran's 2007 film, Mayakannadi. Subsequently, performing a variety of supporting roles, he found more success as a character actor, with his most notable performances in Pasanga (2009), Naadodigal (2009), Naan Mahaan Alla (2010), Yuddham Sei (2011), Mankatha (2011), Moodar Koodam (2013) and Pannaiyarum Padminiyum (2014).

Career

Jayaprakash hails from Sirkazhi, Tamil Nadu, India. Before entering the film industry, he had worked in various fields such as dairy farming, petrol business, transport and billiards parlour.

He started acting at age of 45. His first film was Mayakannadi in 2007, following which he received more acting assignments. His role as the village school teacher, Chokkalingam, in Company Production's critically acclaimed Pasanga is considered his breakthrough performance, for which he received accolades and several awards. Apart from Pasanga, he played notable supporting roles in other commercially successful ventures such as Naadodigal, Vamsam, Naan Mahaan Alla, Bale Pandiya and Yudham Sei and Mankatha. He also appeared in Pandiraj's Marina.

Producer
As a producer he has produced several films like Chellamae, April Maadhathil, Thavasi and many more under his GJ Cinema banner. He hasn't starred in any of the film that he had produced. Before starting GJ Cinema banner he produced films like Porkaalam and Gopala Gopala with M. Kajamaideen under Roja Combines. Both GJ cinema and Roja Combines have been closed down for long time.

Personal life
Jayaprakash has two sons, Niranjan and Dushyanth, who turned actors with the 2010 M. Sasikumar film Eesan.

Filmography

As actor

Films

Web series

As producer

Dubbing artist

References

External links
 

Indian male film actors
Male actors in Tamil cinema
Film producers from Tamil Nadu
Tamil film producers
Living people
Marathi people
Filmfare Awards South winners
1962 births
People from Mayiladuthurai district
Male actors from Tamil Nadu
21st-century Indian male actors